is a Japanese anime series directed by Kenichi Kasai and with original illustrations by Tomohisa Kai while Aki Tsunaki adapted the designs to illustrations. The series was produced by Yumeta Company with additional production through Aniplex, Dax Production, and TV Tokyo. The series was meant to introduce some of the facts and general knowledge about the train stations on Toei Ōedo Line and ran for thirteen episodes between October 4, 2009 until December 27, 2009.

Characters

Miracle Train Employees
 
He is the representation of Roppongi Station, which starts the Oedo Line. Roppongi Station is numbered E23. He has red-brown hair and blue eyes. He is a kind, calm mature person who is capable of seeing what troubles someone, as shown in episodes 1 and 2 where he was able to catch onto the fact that both customers had something bothering them beside what they said. He is considered boring because he tends to talk less often than the other stations and has a quiet, slightly shy but friendly demeanor. He is particularly good with computers and often writes reports on their customers and how they helped them. His catchphrase, which he often uses to reassure his fellow train stations is "Don't worry”.
 
He is the representation of Ryogoku Station, numbered E12. He has purple eyes and orange hair. He is hot blooded, loud, friendly and enjoys watching historical dramas. He is obsessed with Japanese history in general.
 
He is the representation of Tsukishima Station, numbered E16. He has green hair and brown eyes. He is conservative, traditional, and loves traditional Japanese culture and food. He is also good at fishing and is particularly fond of monjayaki (or monja for short), which is a type of Japanese fried batter with various ingredients inside.
 
He is the representation of Shinjuku station, numbered E27. He has dusty brown hair and purple eyes and is flirtatious. He looks like a host or model and can be narcissistic but mature. He has three brothers. He prefers women and at one point in episode 9 even initially refused to help out Keita because he was male. Despite this, he does care for his fellow train stations.
 
He is the representation of Tochōmae station numbered E28. He wears glasses and has black hair and red eyes. He is the leader of the train stations and considered the most serious and enjoys police dramas. He helps the most passengers with their problems. He is considerate, responsible, loves order and hates when things do not go as scheduled. The others have commented he would make a great father someday. He hates thrill rides and is very knowledgeable about various facts, including trains. He is self conscious about his forehead and how big it is.
 
He is the representation of Shiodome Station, numbered E19. He is the youngest (his train station having been opened most recently) He has blond hair and blue eyes and also wears blue earrings. He knows a lot about trains and is considered cute but lacking in tact because of his youth and inexperience. He loves cute things and is knowledgeable about tea.
 
The tour guide of the Miracle Train. She ironically tends to get lost on the train. She has the appearance of a young girl with long red hair and wears a pink conductor outfit. It is revealed in the last two episodes that she is actually a normal human that once went to Roppongi station when she was young and separated from her class group. She saw Fumi Roppongi collapsed near the train and took him inside, accidentally becoming part of the Miracle Train group. Because her presence is an abnormality, she is forced to leave the Miracle Train, going back in time and living her life properly. She does, however, retain her memories of her life on the Miracle Train and at the end of the episode reunites with Roppongi as an adult. It is implied she and Roppogi have feelings for each other.
 
The conductor of the train who is never given a proper name. He is an enigmatic figure who guides where the Miracle Train is headed and who boards it. He wears a mask that hides his face and seems to know more than he lets on.
 
The pet dog of the stations. While he cannot talk, he has the same intelligence as that of a human. He often seems annoyed at the antics of the train stations and often has biting, sarcastic remarks about their many antics and actions.

Passengers
 
She is the passenger shown in episode 1. She boards Miracle Train and is assisted mainly by the Roppongi. She initially seeks help searching for her lost dog Kotaro but admits her real problem is that she just started high school but her friends went to other schools and she is not good at meeting new people and can not make friends. After hearing someone mention a girl was gloomy, even though she wasn't sure it was her she became scared to go to school and felt the only person who understood her was her dog. Eventually, through talking with Roppongi, she decides to change herself.
 
She is the passenger shown in episode 2 mainly helped by Tocho. She boards Miracle Train after deciding to quit her job at her firm because they want to transfer her overseas at the U.S. but she did not want to, causing her boyfriend who did not want a long distance relationship to also break up with her. Tocho gives her the courage to go through with it, saying she will meet new people and make new memories.
 
She is the passenger shown in episode 3 and is assisted mainly by Shinjuku. She intended to go to an omiai despite her young age as she prefers to live her life scheduled and hates trains because her parents met on a train and as a result are obsessed with them and even named her after a train but Shinjuku teaches her to relax and live life to the fullest while learning to love trains as a result.
 
She is the passenger in episode 4 mainly helped by Ryogoku. She is a fortune teller mainly specialized in palm reading but has tried to learn other forms of fortune telling to help others. She initially did not want to state her problem because she believed that as a fortune teller she should listen to other people's problems and help them and should not receive help for herself. She got into a fight with her friend since high school (for nine years) and fortune telling coworker Asuka regarding how to run their fortune teller shop "tomorrow's Future" as Asuka wanted to expand their business but Mirai claims to no longer wants to handle fortune telling. Ryogoku helps remind her of why she wanted to fortune tell and she tells Asuka she just wants to do three people at a time but understands why Asuka wants to expand their business. The two ultimately separate their business but reconcile.
 
She is the passenger in episode 5 mainly helped by Shiodome. A train maniac who competes with her male friend to see who knows more but admits later in what she was really interested in was not the trains but her friend and wanted his attention so pretended to like trains. Shiodome develops a crush on her but she politely rejects him.
 
She is the passenger in episode 6 mainly helped by Tsukushima. She is the daughter of a wealthy CEO but grew tired of being restrained and tried to run away to experience life away from her home if even for one day.
 
She is the passenger in episode 8 mainly helped by Tocho (with a little help from Toshiamen and Roppongi). She is a young runaway girl looking for her lost father, who happens to look like Tocho. She decides to go to the amusement park where her father promised to take her. She eventually comes to terms with the fact he has died but promises to marry Tocho in the future, having developed a crush on him.
 
He is the passenger in episode 9 helped by everyone. He is the only known male passenger to board the Miracle Train, which usually only serves female passengers. This is because while the Miracle Train acknowledged the female passenger who was supposed to board the train, the male passenger behind touched in so fast and was unintentionally acknowledged as well. He is effeminate and loves cute things but tries to change that about himself because he believes his girlfriend whom he wants to marry fell in love with the manly hard working person he is at their workplace but the train stations help him realize it is better to be himself. He eventually confesses his love for cute things to his girlfriend who accepts him for who he is and the two have plans to marry.
 
She is the passenger in episode 10 helped mainly by Tocho. She appears in Tocho's favorite police dramas but has grown tired of the role. Eventually, Tocho helps her rekindle her love for the role.
 
She is the passenger in episode 11 helped by everyone. She is a ghost who died in a hit and run when she crossed the street to try to grab a child's balloon for the child. She is a kind person but tends to get distracted helping people. She wanted to meet her beloved one last time on her death anniversary to help him move on.

Minor characters
 
A part of the Shinjuku Station labeled E29. His place is the only one that has Shimizu Bridge printed on the ticket.
 
A part of the Shinjuku Station labeled E02. His place has good restaurants.
 
A part of the Shinjuku station labeled E01. He is a wide open station with the theme of light.
 
A train station labeled E36. He is kind, very knowledgeable, and observant. He has short brown hair and green eyes. He is considered a senpai for the main train stations since he opened in 1927.
 
A train station labeled E6. He has long brown hair tied in a ponytail and wears glasses. He has a serious face but actually tends to make bad jokes. He has children and cooks but it is unknown who he had children with. He wears a lab coat and talks like a scientist.

Anime
The anime television series is produced by Yumeta Company and directed by Kenichi Kasai with scripts from Keiichirou Daichi, Natsuko Takahashi, Yoichi Kato, and Yuka Yamada and character designs by Aki Tsunaki (Tomohisa Kai did the original character designs). The opening theme is "Montage" by Kenn, Ryotaro Okiayu, Yuki Kaji, and Masakazu Morita while the ending theme was "Stories" by Shuhei Kita. The anime ran from October 4, 2009 until December 27, 2009.

Miracle Train Episode List

References

External links

2009 anime television series debuts
TV Tokyo original programming
Yumeta Company